GFL may refer to:

Sport 
 Geelong Football League, an Australian rules football league
 Georgia–Florida League, a defunct minor baseball league
 German Football League, an American football league in Germany
 German Football League 2, a tier-two American football league in Germany
 Gibraltar Football League, an association football league in Gibraltar
 Gippsland Football League, an Australian rules football league
 Goldfields Football League, an Australian rules football league
 Utah Girls Football League, a youth American football league

Other uses 
 GFL Environmental, a Canadian waste collection company
 Floyd Bennett Memorial Airport, in Warren County, New York
 GDNF family of ligands
 Ghana Federation of Labour
 Great Food Live, a British television programme
 Gujarat Fluorochemicals Limited, an Indian chemical company
 Girls' Frontline, a strategy role-playing mobile game